Hyde Park Angels is a venture capital group founded in 2007 and based in Chicago, IL, which focuses on angel investments.

Structure and application process 
The Hyde Park Angels' approach to investing is "more like a traditional venture capital firm."

The process is:
 Companies are vetted and whittled down to about 75
 Those 75 are brought before a screening committee
 The screening committee signs off on a select few after consulting internal Hyde Park Angels (HPA) subject-matter experts
 Companies deliver pitch to subsection of HPA
 If selected, get to pitch before HPA
 Investment status determined with investment coming from group rather than individuals

Leadership 
Peter Wilkins is the managing director since 2014, with Michael Sachaj as the principal.

Board members include: 
 Doug Monieson
 Bob Giammanco
 Chris Jensen
 Michelle Collins
 Joe LaManna
 Chris McGowan
 Ellen Rudnick
 Craig Vodnik
Hyde Park Angels was founded in April 2007 by classmates of Chicago Booth XP-76. They were Jeffrey Carter, Ryan Humphreys, Vishal Verma, Rick Schultz, Sharon McDade and Galen Williams.

Investments 
As of 2016, Hyde Park Angels has investments in: Ahaology, Base, Brilliant, Catalytic, Dabble, The Eastman Egg Company, Farmlogs, Fishidy.com, fourkites, Geofeedia, Glidera, In Context Solutions, intellihot, kenna, luxury garage sale, motion.ai, packback, parkwhiz, Persio, Prism Analytical Technologies, Quikly, regroup therapy, RepIQ, Retrofit, Rheaply, Rithmio, sentic technologies, ShipBob, simple mills, sonar med, stream link software, transparent career, techstars, turbo appeal, ui co, Xaptum, ycharts.

Previous investments include NuCurrent.

Acquisitions 
Several of Hyde Park Angels' portfolio companies have subsequently been acquired: Fee Fighters, Food Genius, Grade Beam, Moxie Jean, Power 2 Switch, Simple Relevance, Supply Vision, Tap Me, Retal Technologies, Tempo IQ.

Partnerships 
Hyde Park Angels works with the Chicago startup incubator 1871 to host events and educational series to help the entrepreneurial community in Chicago and the MidWest. They also contribute to the local tech community through various other events, including TechWeek.

References 

Financial services companies established in 2007
Angel investors
Venture capital firms of the United States
2007 establishments in Illinois